STUDIO was a subscription television arts channels available in Australia on the FOXTEL and AUSTAR platforms.

History

The channel launched in April 2010 as STVDIO, and was owned and operated by SBS Subscription TV, a subsidiary of free-to-air broadcaster Special Broadcasting Service.

STUDIO was Australia's only channel dedicated to arts and entertainment. It broadcast classical and popular music, literature, film, visual arts and dance with documentaries and performances.

As part of a brand redesign in March 2012, the channel was renamed STUDIO, considered a more accessible name.

The channel was forced to closure on 27 March 2015 as it was unable to re-negotiate their contract with Foxtel, and was instead replaced with Foxtel-owned channel Foxtel Arts. As a result, a number of the channel's artsprogrammies moved to SBS and its video on demand service.

Local Australian Productions
The channel alsorecorded live local music, theatre and dance productions, known as the STUDIO Season Ticket.

 Smoke & Mirrors with iOTA – Filmed at The Famous Spiegeltent during Sydney Festival 2011.
 Amadou & Mariam at WOMADelaide 2011 – The blind Mali duo performed at Adelaide's world music festival in March.
 Iconic Songs with Archie Roach – Indigenous performer and activist Archie Roach was joined by long-time friends Shane Howard and Neil Murray at WOMADelaide 2011 to perform three iconic Australian songs.
 The 2011 Helpmann Awards – Australia's performing arts awards, broadcast live from the Sydney Opera House.
 The Australian Ballet presents Graeme Murphy's Romeo & Juliet – Live broadcast from Melbourne's the Arts Centre.
 notes from the hard road and beyond from Melbourne Festival 2011  – STUDIO announced it would record the closing night of the Melbourne International Arts Festival with performances by Joss Stone, Mavis Staples, and Rickie-Lee Jones.

Arts Community
In addition to live performances, STUDIO also broadcast news about the Australian arts community. The channel broadcast short programs called [ STUDIO ‘Artbreaks’ which included interviews with local and international artists, performers, and coverage of current arts events.

Past artists include:
 Dance choreographer Graeme Murphy
 Director Wim Wenders]
 Author Thomas Keneally 
 Author Shaun Tan
 Conductor and classical musician Vladimir Ashkenazy 
 Author Tim Winton
 Singer Dee Dee Bridgewater
 Theatre icon John Bell
 Director Adam Elliot
 Go-Betweens founder Robert Forster
 Speigeltent Maestro David Bates
 Opera star Cecilia Bartoli
 You Am I member Tim Rogers

Past arts events covered include:
 21st Century: Art in the First Decade exhibition at GoMA, Brisbane
 Brisbane Festival 2011
 Adelaide Cabaret Festival
 Biennale of Sydney 2010
 Desert Harmony Festival 2010
 Edge of Elsewhere exhibition, Sydney Festival 2010
 New Indigenous Wings, National Gallery of Australia
 Ballets Russes: The Art of Costume exhibition, National Gallery of Australia
 Venice Biennale 2011
 ACO Instruments – from the Instrument Fund
 ABAF Awards 2010

References

Television channels and stations established in 2010
English-language television stations in Australia
Special Broadcasting Service
Television channels and stations disestablished in 2015
2015 disestablishments in Australia
Defunct television channels in Australia